The Ministry of Defence is a ministry in Zambia. It is headed by the Minister of Defence and oversees the Zambian Defence Force and Zambia National Service.

List of ministers

Deputy ministers

References

Defence
Military of Zambia
 
Zambia